Leif Ahrle (born 10 June 1943) is a Swedish actor. He has appeared in more than 35 films and television shows since 1965.

Selected filmography
 The Shot (1969)
 The White Wall (1975)
 Sally and Freedom (1981)

References

External links

1943 births
Living people
Male actors from Stockholm
Swedish male film actors